Oscypek (pronounced , Polish plural: oscypki), rarely Oszczypek, is a smoked cheese made of salted sheep milk exclusively in the Tatra Mountains region of Poland. Oscypek is made by an expert named "baca", a term also denoting a shepherd in the mountains. The cheese is a traditional holiday cheese in some European countries and is often pan fried and served with cranberry jam (żurawina) on the side.

Process and varieties
A similar cheese is made in the Slovak Tatra Mountains under the name oštiepok. The cheeses differ in the ratio of their ingredients, the cheesemaking process and the characteristics of the final product. Oscypek needs to be made from at least 60% sheep's milk, and must weigh between 60 and 80g and measure between 17 and 23cm. It can only be produced between late April to early October, when the sheep used is fed on fresh mountain grass.

Oscypek is made using salted sheep's milk, with the addition of cows' or goats' milk strictly regulated by the protected recipe. Unpasteurized salted sheep's milk is first turned into cottage cheese, which is then repeatedly rinsed with boiling water and squeezed. After this, the mass is pressed into wooden, spindle-shaped forms in decorative shapes. The forms are then placed in a brine-filled barrel for a night or two, after which they are placed close to the roof in a special wooden hut and cured in hot smoke for up to 14 days.

History
The first mention of cheese production in the Tatra Mountains dates back to the 15th century, in a document from the village of Ochotnica in 1416. The first recorded recipe for Oscypek was issued in 1748 in the Żywiec area. 
There is also a smaller form called redykołka, known as the 'younger sister' of oscypek.

Since 14th of February 2008 Oscypek has been registered under the European Union Protected Designation of Origin (PDO).

[ 
{"type": "ExternalData", "service": "geoshape", "ids": "Q770911",  "properties": { "fill": "#FFFF00" } }, //Nowy Targ county
{"type": "ExternalData", "service": "geoshape", "ids": "Q1147584", "properties": { "fill": "#FFFF00" } }, //Tatra county
{"type": "ExternalData", "service": "geoshape", "ids": "Q1116177", "properties": { "fill": "#FFFF00" } }, //Bystra-Sidzina commune
{"type": "ExternalData", "service": "geoshape", "ids": "Q167783",  "properties": { "fill": "#FFFF00" } }, //Zawoja commune
{"type": "ExternalData", "service": "geoshape", "ids": "Q2081361", "properties": { "fill": "#FFFF00" } }, //Niedźwiedź commune
{"type": "ExternalData", "service": "geoshape", "ids": "Q2461186", "properties": { "fill": "#FFFF00" } }, //Kamienica commune
{"type": "ExternalData", "service": "geoshape", "ids": "Q11798166","properties": { "fill": "#FFFF00" } }, //Olszówka
{"type": "ExternalData", "service": "geoshape", "ids": "Q7278474", "properties": { "fill": "#FFFF00" } }, //Raba Niżna
{"type": "ExternalData", "service": "geoshape", "ids": "Q8080784", "properties": { "fill": "#FFFF00" } }, //Łostówka
{"type": "ExternalData", "service": "geoshape", "ids": "Q9395219", "properties": { "fill": "#FFFF00" } }, //Łętowe
{"type": "ExternalData", "service": "geoshape", "ids": "Q6695500", "properties": { "fill": "#FFFF00" } }, //Lubomierz
{"type": "ExternalData", "service": "geoshape", "ids": "Q2460034", "properties": { "fill": "#FFFF00" } }, //Piwniczna-Zdrój commune
{"type": "ExternalData", "service": "geoshape", "ids": "Q2606201", "properties": { "fill": "#FFFF00" } }, //Muszyna commune
{"type": "ExternalData", "service": "geoshape", "ids": "Q1443261", "properties": { "fill": "#FFFF00" } }, //Krynica-Zdrój commune
{"type": "ExternalData", "service": "geoshape", "ids": "Q553636",  "properties": { "fill": "#FFFF00" } }, //Istebna commune
{"type": "ExternalData", "service": "geoshape", "ids": "Q554537",  "properties": { "fill": "#FFFF00" } }, //Milówka commune
{"type": "ExternalData", "service": "geoshape", "ids": "Q555569",  "properties": { "fill": "#FFFF00" } }, //Węgierska Górka commune
{"type": "ExternalData", "service": "geoshape", "ids": "Q379249",  "properties": { "fill": "#FFFF00" } }, //Rajcza commune
{"type": "ExternalData", "service": "geoshape", "ids": "Q555847",  "properties": { "fill": "#FFFF00" } }, //Ujsoły commune
{"type": "ExternalData", "service": "geoshape", "ids": "Q553465",  "properties": { "fill": "#FFFF00" } }, //Jeleśnia commune
{"type": "ExternalData", "service": "geoshape", "ids": "Q553407",  "properties": { "fill": "#FFFF00" } }, //Koszarawa commune
]

See also

  – Polish sheep's milk cheese
  – Polish cheese similar to oscypek, but made with milk from cattle
 
 
 
 
 
  – The "younger sister" of oscypek

References

Polish cheeses
Smoked cheeses
Sheep's-milk cheeses
Polish products with protected designation of origin
Cheeses with designation of origin protected in the European Union
Stretched-curd cheeses